The North Macedonia men's national tennis team represents North Macedonia in Davis Cup tennis competitions. It is governed by the Macedonian Tennis Federation. Its previous official appellation used by the International Tennis Federation was "FYR Macedonia".

North Macedonia currently competes in the third group of Europe Zone.

History
North Macedonia competed in its first Davis Cup in 1995. Macedonian players previously represented Yugoslavia.

Current team (2022) 

 Gorazd Srbljak
 Stefan Micov
 Obrad Markovski
 Berk Bugarikj
 Kalin Ivanovski

See also

Davis Cup
North Macedonia Fed Cup team

External links

Davis Cup teams
Davis Cup
Davis Cup